Sir William Allanson (died 6 December 1656) was an English merchant draper and politician who sat in the House of Commons  from 1640 to 1653.

Allanson was the son of Christopher Allanson of Ampleforth, North Yorkshire. He was a draper and became a freeman of the city of York in 1610. He was twice Lord Mayor of York, once when he was knighted by King Charles I at York on his visit there 26 May 1633.

In November 1640, Allanson was elected Member of Parliament for York in the Long Parliament. 
 
Allanson was buried at St Michael le Belfrey, York on 7 December 1656.

Allanson married firstly on 12 December 1621 Lucy Orracke, daughter of Alexander Orracke. She died in September 1631. He married secondly in 1632 to Anne Tancred, daughter of Charles Tancred.

References

Year of birth missing
1656 deaths
English MPs 1640–1648
English MPs 1648–1653
Lord Mayors of York